“” is verse 490 of Book 2 of the "Georgics" (29 BC), by the Latin poet Virgil (70 - 19 BC). It is literally translated as: “Fortunate, who was able to know the causes of things”. Dryden rendered it: "Happy the Man, who, studying Nature's Laws, / Thro' known Effects can trace the secret Cause" (The works of Virgil, 1697). 

Virgil may have had in mind the Roman philosopher Lucretius, of the Epicurean school.

Uses

This sentence is often written with a present tense instead of the past tense: “” (“Fortunate is he, who is able to know the causes of things”). Translators have also often added the adjective "hid" or "hidden" to qualify the causes.

The full verse states:Which translates to:He who’s been able to learn the causes of things is happy,

and has set all fear, and unrelenting fate, and the noise

The phrase is engraved in the stone bust of Clodomiro Picado Twight in the University of Costa Rica, in San Pedro and also engraved on a stone fireplace at the Henry Wallace building in the Tropical Agricultural Research and Higher Education Center (CATIE) in Turrialba, Costa Rica. 

It appears prominently on a board in the 1990 film Awakenings (at time 1:06:19). The sentence also appears in Latin in the English-language edition of Asterix and Obelix All at Sea on page 41. The reply to this sentence is: "Never Mind The Potty Causes Now!"

References
                               
Virgil, Georgica (II, v. 490).    

Virgil
Latin quotations